Gary W. C. Williams is a former award winning Canadian Football League player.

A graduate of the Toronto Parkdale Lions junior program, Williams played 13 games for the Toronto Argonauts in 1957. He rushed once for 2 yards, and caught 1 pass for a touchdown. It was his 72 punt returns for 424 yards (a 5.9 yards average) that won him the Gruen Trophy as the Eastern Conference (the Big Four) rookie of the year. This was when the trophy was awarded only to Canadian players.

References

1936 births
Toronto Argonauts players
Calgary Stampeders players
Canadian Football League Rookie of the Year Award winners
Living people